Najla Ben Abdallah  (Arabic:  نجلاء بن عبد الله ,born June 16, 1980), is a Tunisian actress, model and flight attendant who played Feriel in the Tunisian series Maktoub. She has appeared in several films including Un fils Mehdi M. Barsaoui's film. Najla has also appeared in several television series.

Biography 
Najla Ben Abdallah born on June 16, 1980, in Tunis. She's a flight attendant for the Tunisair airline. She is an ambassador of several products. 

In 2009, She started her career with advertisements. Najla tried her first chance in a Ramadan soap opera called Donia alongside Nadia Boussetta. Her first cinematic role is that of Lilly in "False Note".

In 2012, she made the cover of the people magazine Tunivisions, then that of the Tunisian magazine E-young in November.

In 2015, Ben Abdallah played the part of Hourya in Mehdi Hmili's film "Thala mon amour" with Ghanem Zrelli.

In 2017, The actress participated this year in  "Bolice 4" series, She also participated in a Libyan soap opera, the filmmaking place in Tunisia for security reasons.

In 2019, Najla Ben Abdallah played a major supporting role of Un fils film with Sami Bouajila , film was awarded at the 2019 Cairo International Film Festival . It had been the film of the Horizons of Arab Cinema competition, in gala projection which was attended, in addition to the director Mehdi M. Barsaoui , the producer Habib Attia and the president of CIFF Mohamed Hefzy, several actors and professionals of Egyptian and foreign cinema and a large audience came to discover this Tunisian film. This film won several prestigious awards, notably at the HAMBURG Film Festival, the Cairo International Film Festival, the International Francophone Film Festival of NAMUR, the CINEMAMED Brussels, the TOZEUR International Film Festival and several other festivals. The members of the various juries which awarded him three prizes: the Special Jury Prize Salah Abou Seif, the UNFPA Prize and the Prize for the best Arab film.

In 2020, she won the award for best actress at the Malmö Arab Film Festival, for her role in the film Un Fils in English " A Son", a film written and directed by Mehdi Barsaoui, won the best award of the 10th edition of the Film Festival  Arabic from Malmö (MAFF in Sweden). She has been chosen by the César Academy to be part of the "César for Most Promising Actress 2021" category for her role in the film "A Son", which has so far won around 30 international awards.

Personal life 
She is mother of two daughters.
In 2020, she affirmed, as a mother, that she greatly values fatherhood.

Filmography

short film 

 2010: Gold Parodies by Majdi Smiri
 2013: Whatever by Ismahane Lahmar: As Neila

Film 

 2012: False Note by Majdi Smiri: As Lilly
 2012: Barabbas by Roger Young: Ester's Friend
 2015: Thala Mon Amour (Thala My Love) by Mehdi Hmili: Houriya
 2019: A Son by Mehdi M. Barsaoui: Maryem Ben Youssef

Television

TV serials 

 2010: Nsibiti Laaziza (Guest of honor of episode 12 of season 1) by Slaheddine Essid: Sawssen
 2010: Donia by Naïm Ben Rhouma
 2012–2014: Destiny (Maktoub) (Seasons 3–4) by Sami Fehri: As Feriel Ben Abdallah
 2013: The Fifth Wife by Habib Mselmani: Rym
 2014: School by Zied Letaiem (season 1): Substitute Teacher
 2015: Naouret El Hawa (season 2) by Madih Belaïd: As Nahed
 2015: Dar Ellozab by Lassaad Oueslati: Honor Guest
 2015: Ambulance by Lassaad Oueslati: As Siwar
 2015: Sultan Achour 10 by Djaffar Gacem: As Cléopâtre VII
 2016: Noss Yum (Syrian Tv-Serial) (Half A Day) by Samer Barqawi
 2016: Al Akaber by Madih Belaïd: Hend
 2016: Embouteillage (Traffic Jam) by Walid Tayaa: Honor Guest
 2017: The Hairdresser by Zied Letaiem: Honor Guest
 2018: Téj El Hadhra by Sami Fehri: Lella Hsseyna
 2019: Awled Moufida 4 (The Sons of Moufida) by Sami Fehri: Najla The Attorney
 2019: The Kingdoms of Fire by Alejandro Toledo and Peter Webber: Triviana
 2019: Wind Alley (Zanket Errih) by Osama Resk: Lwiza
 2020: Awled Moufida 5 (Awled Moufida) by Sami Fehri: Najla The Attorney

TV Movies 

 2012: The Escape From Carthage by Madih Belaïd

TV shows 
 2012:  Labes (We are Fine) on Ettounsia TV
 2012: Klem Ennes (The People's Talk) on El Hiwar El Tounsi
 2013: Dhouk Tohsel (Take a Bite you will be compromised) (Episode 15) on Tunisna TV
 2014: Dhawakna (Take a Bite) (Episode 5) on Telvza TV
 2014: L’anglizi (The English) (Episode 10) on Tunisna TV
 2016: Tahadi El Chef (The Chef Challenge) (Episode 3) on M Tunisia
 2017: 100 Façons (100 Ways) on Attessia TV
 2018: Fekret Sami Fehri (The Idea of Sami Fehri) on El Hiwar El Tounsi
 2018: Labes on El Hiwar El Tounsi
 2018: Dimanche Tout Est Permis (In Sunday Everything is Allowed) (Tunisia) on El Hiwar El Tounsi
 2019: Dima Labes (We are Always Fine) on Attessia TV
 2020: 90 Minutes on El Hiwar El Tounsi

Videos 

 2011: Advertising spot for the chain of supermarkets Magasin général
 2011: Advertising spot for Tunisiana
 2011: Advertising spots for dessert cream Danette de Danone
 2018: POINT M perfumeries: brand ambassador

Awards 

 Golden Orange International Film Competition Best Actress Award.
Best actress 2020 at the Malmö Arab Film Festiva

References

External links 

 
 

1980 births
Living people
Tunisian film actresses
Tunisian television actresses
Tunisian female models
People from Tunis
Aviation pioneers
Flight attendants
American women aviators
Malmö Arab Film Festival winners
21st-century American women